The Wild Swans are a post-punk band from Liverpool, England, which originally formed in 1980 shortly after Paul Simpson left The Teardrop Explodes. The band's personnel has been subject to regular turnover, with vocalist Simpson being the only constant member.

The original incarnation of The Wild Swans lasted until 1982, issuing one single. A reconstituted version of the band issued two albums from 1988 to 1990 before dissolving again. In 2009, Simpson put a new lineup together and the group played numerous live dates, issuing a new studio album in 2011.

The Wild Swans also spun off two charting splinter projects; Care and The Lotus Eaters. Members of The Wild Swans have also been members of Echo & The Bunnymen, The Icicle Works, The Woodentops, The Brian Jonestown Massacre and The Lightning Seeds.

History

Origins:  The Wild Swans, Mark I (1980–1982)
The Wild Swans formed in 1980 when Paul Simpson, who had left The Teardrop Explodes after the recording of their first single, teamed up (on vocals) with Jeremy Kelly (guitar), Ged Quinn (keyboards), James Weston (bass) and Justin Stavely (drums).

An opportunity arose when Pete de Freitas of Echo & the Bunnymen (an old friend and flatmate of Simpson's) agreed to fund their first single "The Revolutionary Spirit" (1982, Zoo Records). Stavely had dropped out of the band, so De Freitas ended up financier, drummer and producer for the single; he was credited under his middle names, Louis Vincent. The single spent 9 weeks on the UK Independent Chart, peaking at no. 13.

Despite turning out to be Zoo's last ever release, the single received a measure of critical acclaim and in time, developed cult status. Subsequent to the release of "The Revolutionary Spirit", weekly rehearsals were given a degree of urgency when the band was offered a BBC Radio 1 John Peel session. Songs on this session, all written by the team of Simpson, Quinn and Kelly, include "No Bleeding", "Enchanted" and "Thirst". By this point, the band was rounded out by two new members: Baz Hughes (bass) and Joe McKechnie (drums).

The Wild Swans were sporadically active in the early 1980s; touring with Echo and The Bunnymen in 1981 following a residency with The Teardrop Explodes. A David Jensen session came in spring 1982, with the band penning and performing "The Iron Bed", "Flowers of England" and "Now You're Perfect".  The group split very soon after this BBC Radio 1 session was broadcast.

Post-split: Care and The Lotus Eaters (1982–1985)
Once the band split, Kelly and Quinn started up The Lotus Eaters with co-founder Peter Coyle. Simpson followed suit with the duo Care, teaming up with Ian Broudie. Strangely, Arista Records, who had refused to sign The Wild Swans, then snapped up both of the offshoots.

Both groups issued several singles. The Lotus Eaters scoring a chart hit, and releasing an album in 1984. Care, meanwhile, reached number 48 in the UK charts with the single "Flaming Sword". Both bands had broken up by 1985, with Care having recorded an unreleased album.

Revival: The Wild Swans, Mark II (1986–1990)

In 1986, the session recorded for the Radio 1 John Peel Show, was finally released on Strange Fruit Records, containing the tracks "No Bleeding", "Enchanted", and "Thirst". It repeated the single's success, peaking at no. 13 on the independent chart. Shortly thereafter, Simpson, Kelly and Quinn got together and began playing once again as The Wild Swans.

By 1988, Quinn had dropped out, Simpson and Kelly were joined on bass by Joe Fearon, and a long-awaited debut album finally emerged. Titled Bringing Home The Ashes (1988, Sire/Reprise Records), and featuring uncredited session players on keyboards and drums, it was produced by Paul Hardiman and yielded two singles, "Young Manhood" (which first appears on the 1987 Sire Records promotional sampler Just Say Yes) and "Bible Dreams". Simpson is nowadays disparaging of the sound developed on the album and feels that some of the aura and magic surrounding the (Mark I) Wild Swans had been lost. "Major label thinking is like a virus, you forget why you started the band and fall into the 'hit' record mind-set". He went on to offer even more stark words of wisdom for those thinking of setting up a band: "Major labels suck the poetry from your bones and fill the gaps with a cement made from cocaine and crushed teenagers."

Bringing Home The Ashes was issued in the United States initially, followed by UK and German releases.  A near-simultaneous promo-only release called Music and Talk From Liverpool included Wild Swans tracks interspersed with interviews with Jeremy Kelly.

A second album on Sire, Space Flower, was released in 1990, subsequent to the departure of Kelly. It was produced by Ian Broudie, and featured a line-up of Paul Simpson (vocals, mellotron, effects), Joe Fearon (bass), Ian Broudie (guitars, keyboards), Chris Sharrock (drums) and Ian McNabb (additional guitars, vocals). Sharrock and McNabb were both of the Liverpool three piece The Icicle Works. Much of the material written for the album had a food-flavoured theme, depicted by the tracks "Melting Blue Delicious", "Tangerine Temple", "Chocolate Bubble-Gum" and "Vanilla Melange".  The album was released in the US, Germany and Japan, but not initially in the UK.

The Wild Swans split up again shortly after Space Flower and Simpson went on to form his own project 'Skyray', recording several singles, EPs and albums, and the spoken word project Dream Diaries.

Reissues and retrospectives (2003–2007)
In 2003, a retrospective collection of rare Wild Swans recordings was compiled and released by Renascent Records. Incandescent, is a double album containing material from 1981 to 1987, but mostly from the band's earliest period. It includes the Peel, Jensen and Long Sessions, as well as a number of live songs, demos and alternative versions. An accompanying booklet featured biographical information on the band and a detailed track by track commentary from Simpson. The familiar 'Icarus Swan' artwork, which first appeared on the cover of "The Revolutionary Spirit", also returned for a second outing.

In 2007, after many years of deletion, Sire Records finally elected to re-release both Bringing Home the Ashes and Space Flower, this time giving them a full UK release.  Both albums were re-packaged as a 2-CD set called Magnitude, whose cover and artwork this time mirrored 1988's Wild Swans – Music and Talk From Liverpool album, complete with familiar Swan design. The album itself was released as part of Sire's April 2007 relaunch of the Korova label, alongside other re-releases from acts like Ian McCulloch and Electrafixion, all 2-CD sets with extra tracks.

Magnitude CD 1 features the whole of Bringing Home the Ashes and the four b-sides from the singles "Young Manhood" and "Bible Dreams", all mastered from the original tapes.

CD 2 features the first UK appearance of the Space Flower album, with the addition of an extra track, recorded back in 1989 but left off the album at the time, called "Tastes Like Tuesday". Another studio recording is the Bill Drummond unreleased single remix of "Melting Blue Delicious". The second disc concludes with five demo recordings, made by Simpson back in late 1988, including early versions of "Melting Blue Delicious" (called "Telescope") and another mix of "Tastes Like Tuesday".

Magnitude enjoyed a relatively short physical shelf life as a 2-CD set, as in June 2007 Warner Brothers (UK) was disbanded by the parent company and the album was deleted.

Second revival:  The Wild Swans, Mark III (2009–2011)
Paul Simpson declared his intention to resurrect The Wild Swans on his Myspace site in late 2007:

 

A year and a half later, the band had indeed reformed, albeit with a very revised line-up: founder and original member Paul Simpson was now joined by original member Ged Quinn, Ricky Rene Maymi (Brian Jonestown Massacre), Les Pattinson (Echo and the Bunnymen), Mike Mooney (Julian Cope/Spiritualized), and Steve Beswick (The Heart Throbs/Slipstream). Quinn very quickly dropped out of performing with the group, but was still regarded as an 'honourary' member who made contributions to the group's promotional artwork.

The "Mark III" version of The Wild Swans released the group's first single in over 20 years in May 2009, a limited edition 10" vinyl single on the Occultation label entitled "English Electric Lightning", with Henry Priestman guesting on keyboards. The single featured at number four on the Mojo magazine 'Playlist' in April 2009, and received favourable reviews in a number of publications. The Wild Swans follow-up single "Liquid Mercury" was released on Occultation on 30 November 2009, and was placed at number 5 in the Mojo Vinyl Countdown.

On 23 and 24 July 2009, The Wild Swans performed live for the first time since their 1990 demise. The sell out gigs were performed to an audience of 200 each night at Liverpool's Static gallery. Henry Priestman guested on keyboards, and guitarist Will Sergeant (Echo and the Bunnymen) joined the band for the encores and was DJ each night. The Wild Swans played a third gig at Static Gallery, Liverpool on 11 December 2009, having officially expanded to a sextet with the addition of newest band member Richard Turvey on keyboards.

On 6 February 2010, The Wild Swans released a five-track live download (The Wild Swans Live at Static Gallery 2009) featuring the tracks "Archangels", "The Revolutionary Spirit", "Tangerine Temple", "Melting Blue Delicious" and "Bringing Home the Ashes". The release was briefly available online to help fund recording costs and was withdrawn from sale in March 2010. The latter three tracks feature guest guitarist Will Sergeant and marked the first recording of Will Sergeant and Les Pattinson playing together since 1997.

Recording of the new album, The Coldest Winter for a Hundred Years, finished on 10 September 2010; it was released early in 2011. In February 2010, Paul Simpson said "For the first time ever I am happy with the results, the unmixed tracks are sounding so good its scary. It may be 20 odd years late but I think we have finally made the definitive Wild Swans masterpiece."  The 13-track album featured 11 new songs alongside the A-sides of both 2009 singles ("Liquid Mercury" appearing in a noticeably different form from the original single mix.) The B-sides, which included the track after which the album is named, did not appear on the album. Joining the sextet as guest performers on a handful of the album's newer tracks were Will Sergeant and Candie Payne; Ged Quinn painted the album cover.

Later that year, the band issued a 3-song EP of outtakes from the Coldest Winter sessions entitled Tracks in Snow.

In June 2011, The Wild Swans embarked on a five-date UK tour. Producer Rich Turvey played keyboards and Stuart Mann joined the band on drums. Later that year, the band performed two successful shows in the Philippines, one concert in Cebu City on 30 September and the other at the SM Mall of Asia, Manila on 1 October.

After 2011
The Wild Swans have neither played live nor released any new material since 2011.  In 2019, a posting on Paul Simpson's website announced that the Wild Swans were recording material (in November 2019) intended for release in 2020/21.  The band line-up was indicated as being Simpson, Marty Willson-Piper, Ricky Maymi, Edgar Jones, Stuart Mann and Richard Turvey.

Since that time, there have been no further specific updates about the recordings, or projected release dates, or the band's personnel.  However, the front page of Simpson's website notes (as of early 2023) that "Paul is working on his long awaited book and also a new ‘Wild Swans’ album."

Discography

Albums

Original studio albums
Bringing Home the Ashes (1988), Sire/Reprise
Space Flower (1990), Sire/Reprise
The Coldest Winter for a Hundred Years (2011), Occultation

EPs
The Peel Sessions (1986), Strange Fruit
Tracks in Snow (2011), Occultation – outtakes from the Coldest Winter sessions

Live albums
For One Stormy Night Only (2010), Astral Girl

Compilation albums
Incandescent (2003), Renascent – compilation of 1980s radio sessions, demo tracks and rarities
The Platinum Collection (2006), Warner Music Philippines
Magnitude (2007), Korova/Sire/Rhino – compiles the first two studio albums, plus B-sides and outtakes

Singles

Band member timeline

References

External links
 

English new wave musical groups
English post-punk music groups
Musical groups from Liverpool
Zoo Records artists
Sire Records artists
Warner Records artists
Musical groups established in 1980